The terms "world politics" or "global politics" may refer to:
Geopolitics, the study of the effects of geography on politics and International Relations (IR)
Global politics, a discipline of political science which focuses on political globalization, away from the dominant state-centric theories of politics and IR
World Politics, a journal of political science and IR

See also
Weltpolitik (translates into English as "world politics")